The 2011–12 Charlotte Bobcats season was the 8th season of the Charlotte Bobcats in the National Basketball Association (NBA), and the 22nd overall season of NBA basketball in Charlotte. Considered to be the worst team of all time, the Bobcats failed to improve on their 34–48 record from the previous season and set the record for the worst winning percentage in a season with a .106 winning percentage, "surpassing" the 1972–73 Philadelphia 76ers (.110) for the lowest winning percentage in NBA history.  They were eliminated from playoff contention on March 28, 2012, after an 88–83 home loss to the Minnesota Timberwolves, with a record of 7–41.  The Bobcats clinched the worst record in NBA history, in a shortened season or otherwise, by losing 104–84 to the New York Knicks on April 26, 2012.

Guard-forward Gerald Henderson led the team in scoring, with an average of 15.1 points per game. Forward-center Bismack Biyombo led in rebounds per game (5.8), and point guard D. J. Augustin recorded a team-high 6.4 assists per game. During the last minutes of their final season game, owner Michael Jordan (who was not in the stands) was shown on the jumbotron and was greeted with a swarm of boos from the home crowd.

Draft picks

Roster

Pre-season
Due to the 2011 NBA lockout negotiations, the programmed pre-season schedule, along with the first two weeks of the regular season were scrapped, and a two-game pre-season was set for each team once the lockout concluded.

|- bgcolor="ccffcc"
| 1
| December 19
| Atlanta Hawks
| 
| Kemba Walker (18)
| Derrick Brown (10)
| D. J. Augustin (3)
| Time Warner Cable Arena9,224
| 1–0
|- bgcolor="ffcccc"
| 2
| December 22
| @ Atlanta Hawks
| 
| Corey Maggette (18)
| DeSagana Diop (6)
| Derrick Brown (4)
| Philips Arena10,094
| 1–1

Regular season

Standings

Record vs. opponents

Game log

|- bgcolor=#ccffcc
| 1
| December 26
| Milwaukee
| 
| D. J. Augustin (19)
| Boris Diaw (11)
| Boris Diaw (9)
| Time Warner Cable Arena17,173
| 1–0
|- bgcolor=#ffcccc
| 2
| December 28
| Miami
| 
| Gerald Henderson (21)
| Boris Diaw (16)
| Boris Diaw (8)
| Time Warner Cable Arena19,614
| 1–1
|- bgcolor=#ffcccc
| 3
| December 30
| Orlando
| 
| Corey Maggette (20)
| Corey MaggetteDeSagana Diop (7)
| Boris Diaw (6)
| Time Warner Cable Arena18,064
| 1–2

|- bgcolor=#ffcccc
| 4
| January 1
| @ Miami
| 
| D. J. White (21)
| Derrick Brown (7)
| D. J. Augustin (7)
| American Airlines Arena20,016
| 1–3
|- bgcolor=#ffcccc
| 5
| January 3
| @ Cleveland
| 
| D. J. Augustin (26)
| Corey Maggette (8)
| D. J. Augustin (9)
| Quicken Loans Arena14,173
| 1–4
|- bgcolor=#ccffcc
| 6
| January 4
| @ New York
| 
| Boris Diaw (27)
| D. J. White (9)
| D. J. Augustin (10)
| Madison Square Garden19,763
| 2–4
|- bgcolor=#ffcccc
| 7
| January 6
| Atlanta
| 
| D. J. Augustin (21)
| D. J. Augustin (12)
| D. J. White (9)
| Time Warner Cable Arena17,827
| 2–5
|- bgcolor=#ffcccc
| 8
| January 7
| @ Indiana
| 
| D. J. Augustin (20)
| Byron Mullens (11)
| D. J. Augustin (4)
| Bankers Life Fieldhouse17,226
| 2–6
|- bgcolor=#ffcccc
| 9
| January 9
| @ New York
| 
| Boris Diaw (19)
| Boris Diaw (10)
| Boris Diaw (7)
| Madison Square Garden19,763
| 2–7
|- bgcolor=#ffcccc
| 10
| January 10
| Houston
| 
| Byron Mullens (15)
| Byron Mullens (10)
| D. J. AugustinKemba Walker (3)
| Time Warner Cable Arena13,421
| 2–8
|- bgcolor=#ffcccc
| 11
| January 12
| @ Atlanta
| 
| Byron Mullens (21)
| Boris Diaw (6)
| D. J. Augustin (9)
| Philips Arena10,597
| 2–9
|- bgcolor=#ffcccc
| 12
| January 13
| Detroit
| 
| Byron Mullens (18)
| Tyrus ThomasBoris DiawByron Mullens (7)
| D. J. Augustin (13)
| Time Warner Cable Arena18,043
|  2–10
|- bgcolor=#ccffcc
| 13
| January 14
| Golden State
| 
| Gerald Henderson (26)
| Byron Mullens (7)
| D. J. Augustin (7)
| Time Warner Cable Arena16,122
| 3–10
|- bgcolor=#ffcccc
| 14
| January 16
| Cleveland
| 
| D. J. Augustin (24)
| Byron Mullens (12)
| D. J. Augustin (8)
| Time Warner Cable Arena14,988
| 3–11
|- bgcolor=#ffcccc
| 15
| January 17
| @ Orlando
| 
| Gerald Henderson (22)
| Bismack Biyombo (10)
| Kemba Walker (6)
| Amway Center18,846
| 3–12
|- bgcolor=#ffcccc
| 16
| January 21
| @ Chicago
| 
| Gerald Henderson (22)
| Gerald Henderson (9)
| D. J. AugustinMatt Carroll (3)
| United Center21,861
| 3–13
|- bgcolor=#ffcccc
| 17
| January 22
| @ New Jersey
| 
| Kemba Walker (16)
| Bismack Biyombo (7)
| Boris Diaw (4)
| Prudential Center10,035
| 3–14
|- bgcolor=#ffcccc
| 18
| January 24
| New York
| 
| Kemba Walker (22)
| Boris Diaw (6)
| Kemba WalkerCory Higgins (2)
| Time Warner Cable Arena16,802
| 3–15
|- bgcolor=#ffcccc
| 19
| January 25
| @ Washington
| 
| Matt Carroll (17)
| Tyrus Thomas (9)
| Kemba Walker (4)
| Verizon Center15,286
| 3–16
|- bgcolor=#ffcccc
| 20
| January 27
| @ Philadelphia
| 
| Kemba Walker (14)
| Kemba Walker (8)
| Matt Carroll (4)
| Wells Fargo Center16,199
| 3–17
|- bgcolor=#ffcccc
| 21
| January 28
| Washington
| 
| Byron Mullens (23)
| Tyrus ThomasKemba Walker (10)
| Kemba Walker (11)
| Time Warner Cable Arena17,761
| 3–18
|- bgcolor=#ffcccc
| 22
| January 31
| @ L. A. Lakers
| 
| Gerald Henderson (14)
| DeSagana Diop (8)
| Kemba Walker (6)
| Staples Center18,997
| 3–19

|- bgcolor=#ffcccc
| 23
| February 1
| @ Portland
| 
| Gerald Henderson (16)
| Boris Diaw (6)
| Boris DiawKemba WalkerCory Higgins (3)
| Rose Garden20,608
| 3–20
|- bgcolor=#ffcccc
| 24
| February 4
| @ Phoenix
| 
| Kemba Walker (22)
| Tyrus Thomas (13)
| Reggie Williams (6)
| US Airways Center14,928
| 3–21
|- bgcolor=#ffcccc
| 25
| February 7
| @ Boston
| 
| Reggie Williams (21)
| Kemba Walker (7)
| Reggie Williams (5)
| TD Garden18,624
| 3–22
|- bgcolor=#ffcccc
| 26
| February 10
| Chicago
| 
| Derrick Brown (10)
| Bismack Biyombo (10)
| Boris Diaw (6)
| Time Warner Cable Arena19,379
| 3–23
|- bgcolor=#ffcccc
| 27
| February 11
| L. A. Clippers
| 
| Kemba Walker (19)
| Bismack BiyomboCorey Maggette (6)
| Kemba Walker (4)
| Time Warner Cable Arena19,110
| 3–24
|- bgcolor=#ffcccc
| 28
| February 13
| Philadelphia
| 
| Corey Maggette (22)
| Byron Mullens (9)
| Boris Diaw (10)
| Time Warner Cable Arena13,773
| 3–25
|- bgcolor=#ffcccc
| 29
| February 15
| @ Minnesota
| 
| Kemba Walker (21)
| Boris Diaw (9)
| Boris Diaw (7)
| Target Center15,139
| 3–26
|- bgcolor=#ccffcc
| 30
| February 17
| @ Toronto
| 
| Reggie Williams (22)
| Bismack Biyombo (13)
| D. J. Augustin (10)
| Air Canada Centre15,575
| 4–26
|- bgcolor=#ffcccc
| 31
| February 19
| @ Indiana
| 
| Derrick Brown (16)
| Bismack Biyombo (8)
| Kemba Walker (5)
| Bankers Life Fieldhouse11,673
| 4–27
|- bgcolor=#ffcccc
| 32
| February 22
| Indiana
| 
| Corey Maggette (20)
| Boris Diaw (11)
| Boris Diaw (8)
| Time Warner Cable Arena13,478
| 4–28
|- bgcolor=#ffcccc
| 33
| February 29
| @ Detroit
| 
| Corey Maggette (17)
| Boris Diaw (6)
| D. J. Augustin (10)
| The Palace of Auburn Hills14,534
| 4–29

|- bgcolor=#ffcccc
| 34
| March 2
| @ San Antonio
| 
| Boris DiawCorey Maggette (14)
| DeSagana Diop (7)
| D. J. AugustinKemba Walker (5)
| AT&T Center18,581
| 4–30
|- bgcolor=#ffcccc
| 35
| March 4
| New Jersey
| 
| Corey Maggette (24)
| Corey Maggette (7)
| Boris Diaw (8)
| Time Warner Cable Arena13,564
| 4–31
|- bgcolor=#ccffcc
| 36
| March 6
| Orlando
| 
| Corey Maggette (29)
| Bismack Biyombo (15)
| D. J. AugustinKemba Walker (8)
| Time Warner Cable Arena13,110
| 5–31
|- bgcolor=#ffcccc
| 37
| March 7
| Utah
| 
| Corey Maggette (25)
| Bismack Biyombo (9)
| D. J. Augustin (8)
| Time Warner Cable Arena10,891
| 5–32
|- bgcolor=#ffcccc
| 38
| March 9
| New Jersey
| 
| Corey Maggette (19)
| Bismack Biyombo (11)
| D. J. Augustin (8)
| Time Warner Cable Arena14,672
| 5–33
|- bgcolor=#ffcccc
| 39
| March 10
| @ Oklahoma City
| 
| D. J. Augustin (22)
| Bismack Biyombo (8)
| D. J. Augustin (7)
| Chesapeake Energy Arena18,203
| 5–34
|- bgcolor=#ccffcc
| 40
| March 12
| @ New Orleans
| 
| Gerald Henderson (15)
| Bismack BiyomboTyrus Thomas (7)
| D. J. Augustin (5)
| New Orleans Arena15,254
| 6–34
|- bgcolor=#ffcccc
| 41
| March 14
| @ Houston
| 
| Derrick Brown (15)
| Bismack Biyombo (5)
| Kemba Walker (8)
| Toyota Center18,128
| 6–35
|- bgcolor=#ffcccc
| 42
| March 15
| @ Dallas
| 
| Corey Maggette (21)
| Bismack Biyombo (11)
| D. J. AugustinKemba Walker (4)
| American Airlines Center20,507
| 6–36
|- bgcolor=#ccffcc
| 43
| March 17
| Toronto
| 
| Gerald Henderson (24)
| Bismack Biyombo (9)
| D. J. Augustin (11)
| Time Warner Cable Arena15,108
| 7–36
|- bgcolor=#ffcccc
| 44
| March 19
| Philadelphia
| 
| Gerald Henderson (14)
| Bismack Biyombo (9)
| D. J. AugustinKemba Walker (5)
| Time Warner Cable Arena12,792
| 7–37
|- bgcolor=#ffcccc
| 45
| March 23
| Milwaukee
| 
| Gerald Henderson (29)
| Tyrus Thomas (7)
| Kemba Walker (7)
| Time Warner Cable Arena13,729
| 7–38
|- bgcolor=#ffcccc
| 46
| March 24
| @ New Jersey
| 
| Byron Mullens (17)
| Byron Mullens (10)
| D. J. Augustin (8)
| Prudential Center13,297
| 7–39
|- bgcolor=#ffcccc
| 47
| March 26
| Boston
| 
| Gerald Henderson (21)
| Byron Mullens (7)
| Derrick BrownKemba Walker (7)
| Time Warner Cable Arena16,357
| 7–40
|- bgcolor=#ffcccc
| 48
| March 28
| Minnesota
| 
| Corey Maggette (22)
| Eduardo Nájera (8)
| D. J. Augustin (8)
| Time Warner Cable Arena10,540
| 7–41
|- bgcolor=#ffcccc
| 49
| March 30
| Denver
| 
| Gerald Henderson (21)
| Byron Mullens (10)
| D. J. Augustin (8)
| Time Warner Cable Arena13,806
| 7–42
|- bgcolor=#ffcccc
| 50
| March 31
| @ Detroit
| 
| Byron Mullens (20)
| Byron Mullens (9)
| D. J. Augustin (10)
| The Palace of Auburn Hills17,082
| 7–43

|- bgcolor=#ffcccc
| 51
| April 3
| @ Toronto
| 
| Byron Mullens (20)
| Byron Mullens (14)
| D. J. AugustinKemba Walker (7)
| Air Canada Centre14,640
| 7–44
|- bgcolor=#ffcccc
| 52
| April 4
| @ Atlanta
| 
| Kemba Walker (21)
| Gerald HendersonByron Mullens (7)
| Kemba Walker (5)
| Philips Arena13,046
| 7–45
|- bgcolor=#ffcccc
| 53
| April 6
| @ Milwaukee
| 
| Byron Mullens (31)
| Bismack BiyomboByron Mullens (14)
| Kemba Walker (8)
| Bradley Center13,374
| 7–46
|- bgcolor=#ffcccc
| 54
| April 7
| Atlanta
| 
| Cory Higgins (22)
| Bismack BiyomboD. J. White (5)
| Kemba Walker (6)
| Time Warner Cable Arena14,715
| 7–47
|- bgcolor=#ffcccc
| 55
| April 9
| Washington
| 
| Corey Maggette (23)
| Derrick Brown (8)
| Kemba Walker (7)
| Time Warner Cable Arena10,303
| 7–48
|- bgcolor=#ffcccc
| 56
| April 10
| @ Cleveland
| 
| Gerald Henderson (21)
| Bismack Biyombo (8)
| D. J. Augustin (11)
| Quicken Loans Arena13,576
| 7–49
|- bgcolor=#ffcccc
| 57
| April 12
| Detroit
| 
| D. J. AugustinDerrick Brown (13)
| Byron Mullens (6)
| D. J. Augustin (5)
| Time Warner Cable Arena10,828
| 7–50
|- bgcolor=#ffcccc
| 58
| April 13
| @ Miami
| 
| Derrick Brown (21)
| Derrick Brown (9)
| D. J. Augustin (6)
| American Airlines Arena19,600
| 7–51
|- bgcolor=#ffcccc
| 59
| April 15
| Boston
| 
| Gerald Henderson (22)
| Bismack BiyomboDerrick Brown (7)
| D. J. Augustin (10)
| Time Warner Cable Arena15,169
| 7–52
|- bgcolor=#ffcccc
| 60
| April 16
| New Orleans
| 
| Gerald Henderson (27)
| Byron Mullens (10)
| Derrick BrownKemba Walker (3)
| Time Warner Cable Arena10,876
| 7–53
|- bgcolor=#ffcccc
| 61
| April 18
| Chicago
| 
| Kemba Walker (16)
| Bismack Biyombo (13)
| Kemba Walker (5)
| Time Warner Cable Arena14,221
| 7–54
|- bgcolor=#ffcccc
| 62
| April 20
| Memphis
| 
| Gerald Henderson (32)
| Byron Mullens (11)
| Kemba Walker (5)
| Time Warner Cable Arena13,428
| 7–55
|- bgcolor=#ffcccc
| 63
| April 22
| Sacramento
| 
| Kemba WalkerByron MullensDerrick Brown (13)
| Byron Mullens (8)
| Kemba Walker (11)
| Time Warner Cable Arena11,317
| 7–56
|- bgcolor=#ffcccc
| 64
| April 23
| @ Washington
| 
| Gerald Henderson (19)
| Byron Mullens (8)
| D. J. Augustin (6)
| Verizon Center17,355
| 7–57
|- bgcolor=#ffcccc
| 65
| April 25
| @ Orlando
| 
| D. J. Augustin (23)
| Kemba Walker (9)
| D. J. Augustin (6)
| Amway Center19,152
| 7–58
|- bgcolor=#ffcccc
| 66
| April 26
| New York
| 
| Gerald Henderson (21)
| Jamario Moon (8)
| D. J. Augustin (7)
| Time Warner Cable Arena16,023
| 7–59

Player statistics

Regular season

|- align="center" bgcolor=""
| 
| 48 || 46 || 29.3 || .376 || .341 || .875 || 2.3 ||style="background:#F26532;color:#FFFFFF;" |6.4 || .8 || .0 || 11.1
|- align="center" bgcolor="#f0f0f0"
| 
| 63 || 41 || 23.1 || .464 ||  || .483 ||style="background:#F26532;color:#FFFFFF;" |5.8 || .4 || .3 ||style="background:#F26532;color:#FFFFFF;" |1.8 || 5.2
|- align="center" bgcolor=""
| 
| 65 || 17 || 22.2 ||style="background:#F26532;color:#FFFFFF;" |.518 || .250 || .667 || 3.6 || 1.0 || .7 || .2 || 8.1
|- align="center" bgcolor="#f0f0f0"
| 
| 53 || 2 || 11.2 || .331 || .186 || .789 || 1.1 || .7 || .3 || .1 || 2.7
|- align="center" bgcolor=""
|  
| 37 || 28 || 27.5 || .410 || .267 || .630 || 5.3 || 4.3 || .5 || .5 || 7.4
|- align="center" bgcolor="#f0f0f0"
| 
| 27 || 9 || 12.0 || .357 ||  || .167 || 3.1 || .9 || .2 || .5 || 1.1
|- align="center" bgcolor=""
| 
| 55 ||style="background:#F26532;color:#FFFFFF;" |55 ||style="background:#F26532;color:#FFFFFF;" |33.3 || .459 || .234 || .760 || 4.1 || 2.3 ||style="background:#F26532;color:#FFFFFF;" |.9 || .4 ||style="background:#F26532;color:#FFFFFF;" |15.1
|- align="center" bgcolor="#f0f0f0"
| 
| 38 || 0 || 11.1 || .325 || .200 || .700 || .9 || .9 || .1 || .2 || 3.9
|- align="center" bgcolor=""
| 
| 32 || 28 || 27.5 || .373 || .364 || .856 || 3.9 || 1.2 || .7 || .0 || 15.0
|- align="center" bgcolor="#f0f0f0"
|  
| 8 || 0 || 15.4 || .292 || .200 ||style="background:#F26532;color:#FFFFFF;" |1.000 || 2.8 || .6 || .1 || .6 || 2.3
|- align="center" bgcolor=""
| 
| 65 || 25 || 22.5 || .425 || .235 || .821 || 5.0 || .9 || .3 || .8 || 9.3
|- align="center" bgcolor="#f0f0f0"
| 
| 22 || 0 || 12.3 || .375 || .276 || .500 || 2.3 || .5 ||style="background:#F26532;color:#FFFFFF;" |.9 || .2 || 2.6
|- align="center" bgcolor=""
| 
| 54 || 30 || 18.8 || .367 || .333 || .759 || 3.7 || .6 || .7 || 1.1 || 5.6
|- align="center" bgcolor="#f0f0f0"
| 
|style="background:#F26532;color:#FFFFFF;" |66 || 25 || 27.2 || .366 || .305 || .789 || 3.5 || 4.4 ||style="background:#F26532;color:#FFFFFF;" |.9 || .3 || 12.1
|- align="center" bgcolor=""
| 
| 58 || 11 || 18.9 || .493 ||style="background:#F26532;color:#FFFFFF;" |1.000 || .705 || 3.6 || .8 || .3 || .4 || 6.8
|- align="center" bgcolor="#f0f0f0"
| 
| 33 || 13 || 22.6 || .416 || .308 || .725 || 2.8 || 1.8 || .6 || .1 || 8.3
|}
  Statistics with the Charlotte Bobcats.

Transactions

Overview

Trades

Free agents

Many players signed with teams from other leagues due to the 2011 NBA lockout. FIBA allows players under NBA contracts to sign and play for teams from other leagues if the contracts have opt-out clauses that allow the players to return to the NBA if the lockout ends. The Chinese Basketball Association, however, only allows its clubs to sign foreign free agents who could play for at least the entire season.

References

Charlotte Bobcats seasons
Charlotte Bobcats
Bob
Bob